John Vaughn Blake (1888 – June 29, 1964) was an American college football player and FBI agent. He played football for Dan McGugin's Vanderbilt Commodores football teams with his brothers Dan and Bob. Dan, Bob, and Vaughn were captains of the 1906, 1907, and 1908 respectively. Vaughn was an end on the football team, selected All-Southern in 1908.  He was later an FBI agent involved with the capture of Alvin Karpis.

Early years
Blake was born in 1888 in Texas to Daniel Bigelow Blake, Sr. and Mary Clara Weldon. Dan, Sr. was a physician and once president of the Nashville Academy of Medicine.

References

1888 births
1964 deaths
American football ends
Vanderbilt Commodores football players
Federal Bureau of Investigation agents
All-Southern college football players
Players of American football from Texas